Million Seller Songs is a compilation album by American pop singer Andy Williams that was released in the fall of 1962 by Cadence Records.  This third album to compile the singer's material features some of the most successful songs Williams had recorded to date (albeit, in most cases, successful for another artist).

The collection made its first appearance on the Billboard Top LPs chart in the issue dated January 12, 1963, and remained there for 43 weeks, peaking at #54.

The album was issued on compact disc for the first time as one of two albums on one CD by Collectables Records on September 12, 2000, the other album being Williams's Cadence release from the summer of 1959, To You Sweetheart, Aloha.  Collectables included this CD in a box set entitled Classic Album Collection, Vol. 1, which contains 17 of his studio albums and three compilations and was released on June 26, 2001.

Track listing

Side one
 "Twilight Time" (Artie Dunn; Al Nevins; Morton Nevins; Buck Ram) - 2:38
 "Autumn Leaves" (Joseph Kosma, Johnny Mercer, Jacques Prévert) - 2:44
 "Canadian Sunset" (Norman Gimbel, Eddie Heywood) - 2:37
 "The Three Bells" (Bert Reisfeld, Jean Villard) - 3:49
 "It's All in the Game" (Charles Gates Dawes, Carl Sigman) - 2:55
 "Butterfly" (Bernie Lowe, Kal Mann) - 2:21

Side two
 "Suddenly There's a Valley" (Biff Jones, Charles Meyer) - 2:52
 "Love Letters in the Sand" (J. Fred Coots, Charles Kenny, Nick Kenny) - 2:32
 "Mam'selle" (Mack Gordon, Edmund Goulding) - 3:33
 "So Rare" (Jerry Herst, Jack Sharpe) - 2:01
 "He's Got the Whole World in His Hands" (traditional) - 3:07
 "Picnic" (Steve Allen, George Duning) - 2:33

Personnel 

Andy Williams - vocalist
Archie Bleyer - arranger, conductor
Hugh Cherry - liner notes

References

Bibliography

1962 compilation albums
Andy Williams compilation albums
Cadence Records compilation albums
Albums arranged by Archie Bleyer
Albums conducted by Archie Bleyer